The Deepwater Shoals Light was a lighthouse located in the James River upstream from Newport News, Virginia.

History
This light was erected in 1855 to mark the western edge of the channel. Ice damaged the light in the following year, and again in 1867; in the latter case the light had to be rebuilt completely, at which time the light was upgraded to a sixth-order Fresnel from the previous masthead light. During the Civil War the light was extinguished by confederate forces; relit in 1862, the Lighthouse Board reconsidered and removed the lighting apparatus to Fort Monroe for safekeeping.

Decommissioning came in 1936, and the house was torn down in 1966. A steel tower light has been erected on the old iron foundation.

Notes

References

Deepwater Shoals Light, from the Chesapeake Chapter of the United States Lighthouse Society

Lighthouses in Virginia
Lighthouses completed in 1855
James River (Virginia)
Lighthouses in the Chesapeake Bay